Ilka (Elkhi) is a rural locality (a selo) in Zaigrayevsky District, Republic of Buryatia, Russia. The population was 2,168 as of 2010. There are 17 streets.

Geography 
Ilka is located 25 km southeast of Zaigrayevo (the district's administrative centre) by road. Shene-Busa is the nearest rural locality.

References 

Rural localities in Zaigrayevsky District